Last of the Summer Wine's twenty-fifth series aired on BBC One. All of the episodes were written by Roy Clarke and produced and directed by Alan J. W. Bell.

Outline
The trio in this series consisted of:

Last appearances

Second Policeman (1987, 1990–2004)

List of Episodes

Christmas Special (2003)

Regular series

DVD release
The box set for series twenty five was released by Universal Playback in September 2014, mislabelled as a box set for series 25 & 26.

References

See also

Last of the Summer Wine series
2004 British television seasons